Ellerson is a surname. Notable people with the surname include:

Beti Ellerson, American filmmaker and activist
Gary Ellerson (born 1963), American football player and radio host
Rich Ellerson (born 1953), American football player and coach

See also
Ellenson